Crawford County is a county in the southwest part of the U.S. state of Wisconsin. As of the 2020 census, the population was 16,113. Its county seat is Prairie du Chien.

History
Along with Brown County, Crawford County is one of Wisconsin's original counties, established by the Michigan Territorial legislature in 1818, and named after William H. Crawford, James Monroe's Treasurer at the time. It originally covered the western half of Wisconsin's present area. In 1836, it was transferred to the newly formed Wisconsin Territory as Michigan prepared for statehood and has gradually been subdivided into its present area.

Geography
The county's highest point is near St. James Church in Rising Sun.

Three rivers run through the county: The Kickapoo River, nicknamed "the crookedest river in Wisconsin" was carved out by glacial run-off. It is considered one of the best Class 1 paddling rivers in the Midwest.
 The Wisconsin River borders the county's southern edge. Although it is the state's busiest river, its run within the county is tranquil, with high bluff escarpments and sandy islands.
 The Mississippi River, serves as the county's western border. The steep limestone cliffs are interspersed with bluffs and prairies.

Adjacent counties
 Vernon County - north
 Richland County - east
 Grant County - south
 Clayton County, Iowa - southwest
 Allamakee County, Iowa - west

Demographics

2020 census
As of the census of 2020, the population was 16,113. The racial makeup of the county was 93.8% White, 1.7% Black or African American, 0.4% Asian, 0.3% Native American, 0.4% from other races, and 3.4% from two or more races. Ethnically, the population was 1.6% Hispanic or Latino of any race.

2020 American Community Survey Estimates
According to the most recent American Community Survey estimates available in 2020, the five largest ancestries, whether partially claimed or claimed in full, were: 36.37% were of German; 19.15% Irish; 13.87%  Norwegian; 7.57% English; and 4.77% Czech or Czechoslovakian.

There were 6,676 households, out of which 20.78% had children under the age of 18 living with them, 49.30% were married couples living together, 23.20% had a female householder with no husband present, and 42.99% were non-families. 17.20% of all households were made up of individuals, and 6.10% had someone living alone who was 65 years of age or older. The average household size was 2.30 and the average family size was 2.93. Of all households in the county, 74.4% of households were owner-occupied, and 25.6% were renter-occupied households.

In the county, the population was spread out, with 21.90% under the age of 20, 15.86% from 20 to 34, 10.54% from 35 to 44, 28.38% from 45 to 64, and 23.38% who were 65 years of age or older. The median age was 47 years. For every 100 females there were 108 males. For every 100 females age 18 and over, there were 107.9 males. In total, 52% of the population was male, and 48% of the population was female.

2010 Census

As of the census of 2010, there were 16,644 people, 6,677 households, and 4,613 families residing in the county. The population density was 12/km2 (30/sq mi). There were 8,480 housing units at an average density of 6/km2 (15/sq mi). The racial makeup of the county was 96.61% White, 1.78% Black or African American, 0.23% Native American, 0.38% Asian, 0.01% Pacific Islander, 0.17% from other races, and 0.68% from two or more races. 0.9% of the population were Hispanic or Latino of any race. 33.6% were of German, 16.0%  Norwegian, 11.4% Irish, 7.2% Czech, 7.2% English and 6.4% United States or American ancestry.

There were 6,677 households, out of which 31.60% had children under the age of 18 living with them, 56.70% were married couples living together, 8.40% had a female householder with no husband present, and 30.90% were non-families. 26.70% of all households were made up of individuals, and 13.00% had someone living alone who was 65 years of age or older. The average household size was 2.48 and the average family size was 3.00.

In the county, the population was spread out, with 24.25% under the age of 20, 8.10% from 18 to 24, 26.20% from 20 to 44, 31.16% from 45 to 64, and 18.40% who were 65 years of age or older. The median age was 39 years. For every 100 females there were 102.20 males. For every 100 females age 18 and over, there were 99.30 males.

Transportation

Major highways

  U.S. Highway 18
  U.S. Highway 61
  Highway 27 (Wisconsin)
  Highway 35 (Wisconsin)
  Highway 60 (Wisconsin)
  Highway 82 (Wisconsin)
  Highway 131 (Wisconsin)
  Highway 171 (Wisconsin)
  Highway 179 (Wisconsin)

Railroads
 BNSF
Wisconsin and Southern Railroad

Buses
Scenic Mississippi Regional Transit

Airport
Prairie du Chien Municipal Airport (KPDC) serves Crawford County and the surrounding communities.

Communities

Cities
 Prairie du Chien (county seat)

Villages

 Bell Center
 De Soto (Mostly in Vernon County)
 Eastman
 Ferryville
 Gays Mills
 Lynxville
 Mount Sterling
 Soldiers Grove
 Steuben
 Wauzeka

Towns

 Bridgeport
 Clayton
 Eastman
 Freeman
 Haney
 Marietta
 Prairie du Chien
 Scott
 Seneca
 Utica
 Wauzeka

Unincorporated communities

 Barnum
 Boydtown
 Bridgeport
 Charme
 Easter Rock
 Fairview
 Harmony Hill
 Montgomeryville
 Mount Zion
 North Clayton
 Petersburg
 Pine Knob
 Plugtown
 Reed
 Rising Sun
 Rolling Ground
 Seneca
 Towerville
 White Corners
 Yankeetown

Politics
When the county was founded, Crawford County was a Republican stronghold, Having voted for the Republican presidential candidate every year from 1892 to 1908, and having only voted Democrat once from 1892 to 1920. The county leaned Republican for many years, until 1988 when Michael Dukakis won it by a margin of 5.3 percentage points. The county voted for the Democratic presidential candidate every year from 1988 to 2012. In 2016, Donald Trump won Crawford County by 5.4 percentage points. Trump would win it again in 2020 by a larger margin of 7.8 percentage points, marking the first time the county voted for a Republican back to back election cycles since 1984 when Ronald Reagan carried Crawford County.

See also
 National Register of Historic Places listings in Crawford County, Wisconsin
 Upper Mississippi River National Wildlife and Fish Refuge

References

Further reading
 History of Crawford and Richland Counties, Wisconsin. Springfield, Ill.: Union Publishing Company, 1884.

External links
 Official Crawford County website
 Crawford County map at the Wisconsin Department of Transportation
 Crawford County Health and Demographic Data

 
1818 establishments in Michigan Territory
Populated places established in 1818
Wisconsin counties on the Mississippi River